The Proceedings of the Institution of Mechanical Engineers, Part I: Journal of Systems and Control Engineering is a peer-reviewed scientific journal established 1991 which covers systems and control studies. It is published by SAGE Publications on behalf of the Institution of Mechanical Engineers.

Abstracting and indexing 
The journal is abstracted and indexed in Scopus and the Science Citation Index Expanded. According to the Journal Citation Reports, its 2018 impact factor is 1.166.

References

External links 
 

English-language journals
Engineering journals
Institution of Mechanical Engineers academic journals
Publications established in 1991
SAGE Publishing academic journals
1991 establishments in the United Kingdom